The Liberal Socialist Party is a former Swiss political party, which existed from 1946 to 1990.

References

Defunct political parties in Switzerland
Liberal socialism